Plaza del Sol (formerly Osceola Square Mall) is an indoor shopping mall in Kissimmee, Florida, United States. It is the only enclosed shopping center in Kissimmee, with over 50 specialty shops. Major tenants of the mall include Ollie's Bargain Outlet, Ross Dress for Less, dd's Discounts, Burlington, Planet Fitness, and Florida Technical College.

History

The mall opened as Osceola Square Mall in 1985. One of its original anchor store was a  Walmart. Other major tenants upon opening included Ross Dress for Less, J. Byrons (later Uptons), Morrison's Cafeteria, and Eckerd Corporation.

In 1996, Walmart moved out of the mall in favor of a Supercenter further down U.S. Route 192. One year later the former Walmart became a Bealls department store.

In 2014, the mall received a Latino-themed makeover and was renamed to Plaza del Sol.

References

External links
https://www.plazadelsolkissimmee.com/

Shopping malls in Florida
Shopping malls established in 1987
Buildings and structures in Kissimmee, Florida
1985 establishments in Florida